Mervyn Lee Adelson (October 23, 1929 – September 8, 2015) was an American real estate developer and television producer who co-founded Lorimar Television.

Early life
Adelson was born to a Jewish family in Los Angeles on October 23, 1929 to Nathan and Pearl Adelson (née Swartz). His parents were the children of immigrants from Russia who had settled in Nebraska. When he was a child, he worked in a grocery store run by his family.

Career
In the 1950s Adelson established himself in Las Vegas where he first met Irwin Molasky and Moe Dalitz. The trio were responsible for building the Las Vegas Country Club as well as what became Sunrise Hospital and Medical Center. Molasky and Adelson later opened Omni La Costa Resort and Spa in 1965. Adelson soon left the real estate industry and co-founded Lorimar Television with Molasky and Lee Rich in 1969.

Personal life and death
Adelson was married and subsequently divorced five times. His first wife was Lori Kaufman with whom he had a daughter and two sons: Ellen Adelson Ross, Andrew Adelson, and Gary Adelson. His second wife was Gail Kenaston, adopted daughter of silent film star Billie Dove. His third wife was the television journalist Barbara Walters to whom he was married from 1981 until 1984. They remarried in 1986 and divorced for the second time in 1992. They met on a blind date. His fourth wife was Thea Nesis with whom he had adopted two daughters, Lexi and Ava Nesis. All his marriages ended in divorce.

Adelson died in Los Angeles on September 8, 2015 from cancer, aged 85.

References

External links

1929 births
2015 deaths
Television producers from California
American film studio executives
American people of Russian-Jewish descent
Businesspeople from Los Angeles
Deaths from cancer in California
American real estate businesspeople
Adelson family
20th-century American businesspeople
21st-century American businesspeople
Jewish American television producers